Tanners is an unincorporated community located in Madison County, Virginia.

References
Board of Geographic Names reference

Unincorporated communities in Virginia
Unincorporated communities in Madison County, Virginia